was a Japanese professional sumo wrestler from Tsushima in the Nagasaki Prefecture. He, along with Sadanoyama, is the only wrestler from Nagasaki who reached or surpassed ōzeki rank and the first wrestler from Tsushima to have done so.

History
Yakichi Kawakami enlisted in the Tsushima Fortress Artillery Battalion, at the age of 20, for military service. However, the division commander at the time recommended that he become a sumo wrestler because of his good physique, so he was discharged and joined the Dewanoumi stable in 1908. Yakichi chose Tsushimanada as his ring name, or shikona, to pay homage to his home island. In his stable, he became the protege of yokozuna Hitachiyama. His first tournament was delayed until 1910 as he suffered from thiamine deficiency. At the age of 25, he was promoted from makushita to jūryō. In 1915, he entered the top division, where he was the tallest wrestler at the time. During his makuuchi years, he disclocated his shoulder after a bout against yokozuna Ōtori. He was however promoted to ōzeki the following tournament, at the age of 31. Tsushimanada, however, did not kept his rank after he injured his left arm during training. He retired in 1922, at the age of 34, and did not remained in his stable as an elder.Upon coming back to Tsushima, he became the mayor of his village.

In 2017, Sakaigawa stable wrestler Masamitsu Umeno, whose family is from Tsushima, was given the Tsushimanada shikona, or ring name, because he comes from a family originally from the island of Tsushima, and being himself from Nagasaki Prefecture.

In 2018, his 1919's keshō-mawashi was retrieved in the Nagasaki Prefectural Tsushima High School as part of the city's survey of cultural assets. The keshō-mawashi was decorated with light blue waves and golden rocky mountains, portraying a classical Tsushima landscape. The lining is decorated with red brocade such as dragons and phoenixes.

Top Division Record

See also
Glossary of sumo terms
List of past sumo wrestlers
List of ōzeki

References 

1887 births
Japanese sumo wrestlers
Sumo people from Nagasaki Prefecture
Ōzeki
1933 deaths